Robb is a masculine given name and a short form (hypocorism) of Robert(o) or Robin/Robyn. The name may also refer to:

People
 Robb Akey (born 1966), American college football head coach and National Football League coach
 Robb Butler (born 1981), American former National Football League player
 Robert Robb Cullen (born 1965), American film and television writer, actor and producer
 Robb Forman Dew (born 1946), female American author
 Robert Robb Flynn (born Lawrence Matthew Cardine in 1967), American lead vocalist and guitarist for the heavy metal band Machine Head
 Robb Gravett (born 1956), British retired racing driver and team owner 
 Robb Hawkins (born 1957), former Australian rules footballer
 Robb Holland (born 1967), American race car driver
 Robb Johnson (born 1955), British musician and songwriter
 Robb Kahl (born 1972), American lawyer and politician, member of the Wisconsin State Assembly
 Robb Kendrick (born 1963), American photographer
 Robb Nen (born 1969), American former National League Baseball player
 Robb Paller (born 1993), American-Israeli baseball player
 Robert Robb Royer (born 1942), American bassist, guitarist, keyboardist and songwriter with the band Bread from 1968 to 1971
 Robb Sapp (born 1978), American stage actor and singer
 Robb Smith (born 1975), American football coach and former player
 Robert Robb Stauber (born 1967), American former National Hockey League goaltender
 Robb Thomas (born 1966), American former National Football League player
 Robert Robb Thompson (born 1953), American founder and president of Family Harvest International, a worldwide network of Christian congregations, and founder of the Family Harvest Church
 Robb Walsh, American food writer, cookbook author and restaurant owner
 Robb Wells (born 1971), Canadian actor and screenwriter
 Robb White (American football) (born 1965), American former National Football League player
 Robb White (1909–1990), American writer of screenplays, television scripts and adventure novels
 Robb Wilton (1881–1957), English comedian and comic actor born Robert Wilton Smith

Fictional characters
 Robb Stark, in the A Song of Ice and Fire fantasy novel series by George R. R. Martin, and its television adaptation, Game of Thrones

See also
Rob (disambiguation)

Masculine given names
Hypocorisms